is a railway station in Shirataka, Yamagata, Japan, operated by the Yamagata Railway.

Lines
Shikinosato Station is a station on the Flower Nagai Line, and is located 28.5 rail kilometers from the terminus of the line at Akayu Station.

Station layout
Shikinosato Station has a single side platform serving traffic in both directions

Adjacent stations

History
Shikinosato Station opened on 13 October 2007.

Surrounding area
 Mogami River
 Shirataka Driving School
 Ayukai Post Office

External links
  Flower Nagai Line 

Railway stations in Yamagata Prefecture
Yamagata Railway Flower Nagai Line
Railway stations in Japan opened in 2007